David Paul Becker (born January 15, 1957) is a former American football defensive back who played for the Chicago Bears in the National Football League (NFL). He played college football at University of Iowa.

References 

1957 births
Living people
American football defensive backs
Iowa Hawkeyes football players
Chicago Bears players